We the People is the debut album by the Washington, D.C.-based group The Soul Searchers.

Track listing

Side A
"We the People" (Chuck Brown, John Buchanan) – 5:28
"Your Love is So Doggone Good" (Dee Ervin, Rudy Love) – 8:36
"It's All in Your Mind" (Chuck Brown, John Buchanan) – 3:06
"Soul to the People" (The Soul Searchers - Chuck Brown, Donald Tillery, Hilton Felton, Horace Brock, John Buchanan, John Euwell, Kenneth Scoggins, Lino Druitt, Lloyd Pinchback) – 2:58

Side B
"Think" (James Brown) – 4:47
"1993" (John Buchanan) – 4:54
"When Will My Eyes See" (Donald Tillery) – 3:30
"Blowout" (John Buchanan) – 6:06

Personnel 
The Soul Searchers
Chuck Brown – electric guitar, lead vocals
John "J.B." Buchanan – trombone, piano
Donald Tillery – trumpet, percussion, vocals 
John Euwell – bass guitar, vocals
Kenneth Scoggins – drums
Lino Druitt – congas, percussion
Lloyd Pinchback – flute, tenor saxophone, soprano saxophone, vocals
Hilton Felton - organ
with:
Horace Brock – organ on "We the People"
Glen Christensen - art direction
Joel Brodsky - photography

References

External links
We the People at Discogs

1972 debut albums
Chuck Brown albums
Jazz-funk albums
Sussex Records albums